Noella Wiyaala (known under the stage name Wiyaala; born 22 December 1986) is a Ghanaian Afro-pop singer-songwriter who sings in her native language Sissala and Waala dialects and English, often combining all three languages within her songs. Wiyaala means "the doer" in the Sissala dialect. She has attained public renown with her single "Make Me Dance" and her androgynous image. After making her name in reality shows in Accra, she established a solo career in 2013 with the hit single "Rock My Body",(Dance move was initiated by Van Caleb) which won her two awards at the 2014 first edition of the All Africa Music Awards, the Most Promising Artiste in Africa and Revelation of The African Continent. Wiyaala is also associated with UNICEF Ghana and the Ministry of Gender, Children and Social Protection of Ghana in campaigns against child marriage, child poverty, health and sanitation. She headlined the 15th London African Music Festival in London. In March 2021, she was among the Top 30 Most Influential Women in Music by the 3Music Awards Women's Brunch.

Life and career

Early life
Noella Wiyaala was born in Wa, Upper West Ghana as one of four sisters and grew up in Funsi and Tumu. She got first singing lessons from her mother, a choir singer in the local church, and she has performed ever since she was 5 years old. Her surname, which she picked for a stage name, means "the doer" in her native Sisaala language. During her late teenage years, she played football as a midfielder. She attended Kanton Secondary School and later Kanton Secondary High in Tumu, where she acquired a reputation for being a tom-boy, playing football and was in demand as a dancer and entertainer in school productions. She also attended Takoradi Polytechnic on an art and design course.

In 2018, Wiyaala disclosed in an interview with Becky on the E with Becks show on Joy Prime that she has been married for four years but would not disclose the name of her husband. Only four people were present at her wedding; a lawyer, a judge and her mum and dad.

Musical career
From early childhood in the Upper West Region of Ghana, Wiyaala was active as an entertainer, earning her first income as a performer in a local bar in Tamale. After attending Kansec Secondary High School, Wiyaala's musical career began in earnest when she joined the local music scene in Wa which centred around Echo Soundz Recording Studios. She performed at local events and recorded as a usually unpaid session singer for artists in the Upper West Region.

In 2009, she recorded her first album Tuma ("Work") in the Sissala language at Echo Soundz Studios in Wa. Songs like "Dannu" and "Dirik…" soon became local hits.

Looking to establish a national career, she made the journey to Accra to audition for Ghana's own "Stars of the Future". At the third attempt in 2011, she earned her way into the finals, winning two Golden Moments awards. Won the 2012 Vodafone ICONS Mixed Edition contest hosted by fellow Ghanaian DJ "Benny Blanco", as part of the Ghanaian band Black N Peach, while singing Tina Turner's "Simply The Best".

She left the Black N Peach band during April 2013, after having released one single ("Wonkoa"), to pursue a solo career with Djimba World Records. Her first release was "Make Me Dance" which featured Ghana's first-ever underwater scenes in a music video, and soon afterwards the single "Rock My Body", which quickly became a hit and won her two awards at the 2014 edition of the All Africa Music Awards. Wiyaala won two of the coveted 23.9-carat gold-plated trophies for The Most Promising Artist in Africa and The Revelation of the African Continent.

In November 2014 Wiyaala released her "official" debut album, the eponymously titled Wiyaala which was nominated for album of the year at the Vodafone Ghana Music Awards 2015 and the All Africa Music Awards 2015. Wiyaala won Video of the Year 2015 with "Africa" at All Africa Music Awards (AFRIMA).

Wiyaala began her international touring career in 2015 with performances at the Hague African Festival in The Netherlands and The Afrikadey Festival in Calgary, Canada. In 2016 Wiyaala performed at WOMAD UK where the Irish Times noted: "Feisty is not the word – she (Wiyaala) is a powerhouse in the mode of a young Angelique Kidjo, Effervescent and funny, she rocked the crowd and got a great reception" Wiyaala also joined In Place of War's "Voices of The Revolution" directed by Errollyn Wallen, an international collective of female musicians from countries of conflict around the world performing at Ronnie Scott's Jazz Club and UK festivals including Shambala, Hull Freedom Festival.

In 2018, Wiyaala, alongside Ilhan Omar, the first Somali-American to be elected into the US Congress and Sahle-Work Zewde, Ethiopia's first female president and others, was selected as one of BBC News "African Women We Celebrated in 2018".

Wiyalaa tours Europe in 2019.

Activism
Wiyaala is outspoken on the male-dominated culture and polygyny of some African countries and to stand up for women's rights and against family violence in her native Ghana. Her song "Tinambayai" in Sisaala language has been regarded as a protest against the exploitation of women in Africa. Wiyaala has featured on BBC talking about early child marriage and has expressed sympathy for feminism as a means to encourage young girls into completing their education so that they can be the ones that make the choices in their lives and also declared her success would serve as an example to her community that there was a future for young women beyond an early forced marriage. "Make Me Dance" has been included in the top of feminist songs for the 2013 winter by Bitch feminist magazine.

Wiyaala has also partnered with the Ministry of Gender, Children and Social Protection of Ghana's government and UNICEF on several projects to help protect the rights of children and public health issues.

Musical style 
Wiyaala sings both in English and her native language Sisaala. She writes her songs herself. She has earned praise for her bold and powerful voice and distinguished timbre. Given Madonna, Michael Jackson, Whitney Houston and Tina Turner as role models and inspiration. She had often been called "man-woman" by the boys in grade school and nowadays she cultivates an androgynous image of herself, for which she had been compared to Grace Jones. Also, she has expressed admiration for African artists like Angelique Kidjo, Miriam Makeba and Brenda Fassie. Her song "Africa" has been inspired by Sherifa Gunu.

Her music style has been described as Afro-pop or Afro-rock with elements of tribal folk music while the latest single "Rock My Body", released in June 2013 together with Ghanaian reggae singer Jupitar leans more towards reggae and dancehall. Wiyaala cited as inspiration the 1969 song "Wreck A Buddy" by Nora Dean and The Soul Sisters. She did also perform in the opening of the 2014 Stanbic Ghana jazz festival.

The single "Go Go Black Stars...Goal!", released in April 2014, on the Djimba World Records label, sung in English and Ghanaian languages, also features tribal drums and stadium choruses. The same song had been picked up as the unofficial hymn of the national football team of Ghana for the 2014 World Cup.

Wiyaala got nominated as Best Sporting Artist in Ghana Sports Excellence Awards 2014.

Discography 
Wiyaala's first release after the breakup with Black N Peach was the single "Make Me Dance". Originally produced by "Genius Selection" in Ghana, it has been remixed in Los Angeles by "Bill Delia" for the international market. "Make Me Dance", along with an acoustic 

version, will be distributed on the "Djimba World Records" label under exclusive license to Paris-based "JTV Digital". The single has been released internationally on 7 October 2013, and it is available on iTunes.

The music video "Make Me Dance" was shot in the studio and on location at Prampram. It features Wiyaala in scenes shot underwater and dancers from the Henokami Culture Troupe from New Ningo. Wiyaala had to take swimming lessons for the best performance while on camera.

"Make Me Dance" got released also in remixed form in Nu-disco, Breakbeat, Drum and bass and Trance styles on 9 December 2013. The "Make Me Dance" Remix EP was mastered in the Paris-based La Source Mastering Studio and released worldwide through Djimba World Records. On 8 December 2013, Wiyaala and Plug.dj held an online-only listening party of the "Make Me Dance" Remixes EP before the official release.

On 28 February 2014, Wiyaala released a new single, "You Got The Power", again distributed on the "Djimba World Records" label. The single is also available on iTunes.

Her self-titled album Wiyaala was launched in November 2014 at the Alliance Française in Accra. Wiyaala performed songs from her album and other local and international superstars. The show also witnessed picturesque dance performance from Flash Mob Ghana. One major highlight of the event was when her parents joined her on the stage to perform, backed by the Vodafone Icons contestants. She also released her song "Angel" in early December 2014 during Viasat 1's The One Show. The video of the single "Africa" taken from the album won Video of the Year at the All Africa Music Awards in November 2015.

During the first edition of the All Africa Music Awards held on 27 December 2014 in Lagos, Wiyaala won two of the coveted 23.9-carat gold-plated trophies for "The Most Promising Artiste in Africa" and "The Revelation of the African Continent". She has been commended by Vodafone for her achievements and hailed as a youth icon and an inspiration for young Ghanaians to strive for success.

In 2015, Wiyaala received six nominations for the Vodafone Ghana Music Awards winning Best Songwriter and Best Female Vocal. At the second edition of the All African Music Awards 2015, Wiyaala won the best Video for "Africa" directed by Stanley Ajjetey. 2015 saw features on AJ Nelson's "Power to The People" and Dark Suburb's "Mama".

In December 2018, Wiyaala released her second album Sissala Goddess, preceded by the singles "Village Sex" and "When the Lord Get Us Ready". She released music videos for both, as well as one for the fourteenth track on the album Feeling Free.

Films and television 
Wiyaala made her TV acting debut in late 2013 in the Viasat 1 hit comedy series MultiKoloured.

In February 2016 Wiyaala made her movie debut in the Ghanaian feature film No Man’s Land. and for which she has been nominated as the Golden Discovery 2016 at the Golden Movie Awards.

Fashion 

Wiyaala got nominated "Female Personality of the Year" at the 2014 Ghana's Fashion Icon Awards, with a dress sketched and designed by herself. She designs her stage dresses and jewellery to showcase the culture of the people from her home region. She has also been recognised for her style by winning the Best Individual Style Award at the Glitz 2015 Style Awards.

Recognized for her sense of fashion, stage dressing and style, Wiyaala is influential throughout the world with Hong Kong's South China Morning Post citing her as a role model.

Philanthropy 
Wiyaala has made her intentions clear to recruit, groom, and sponsor young talents from Funsi and its surroundings as her way of giving back to society. She built an Arts and Culture Center in her community.

Videography

Awards and nominations 

|-
|
Ghana music awards UK 2019Best international touring act<https://www.musicinafrica.net/magazine/ghana-music-awards-uk-2019-all-winners>

Tour 
Full List of Wiyaala’s Europe Tour 2019 And Their Dates
Wiyaala European tour 2019

References

External links
 
 

1986 births
Living people
People from Upper West Region
Takoradi Technical University alumni
21st-century Ghanaian women singers
21st-century Ghanaian singers
Ghanaian singer-songwriters